The Kite-class minesweepers were a class of two ships operated by the United States Navy during World War II.

Both ships were built as fishing trawlers in 1928 by the Bath Iron Works Corporation of Bath, Maine, for F. J. O'Hara and Sons, Inc. of Boston, Massachusetts.

The ships were acquired by the U.S. Navy in late 1940, and converted to minesweepers at Bethlehem Steel Co. of East Boston, Massachusetts, and commissioned in early 1941. Both were disposed of towards the end of the war.

Ships

References 

Mine warfare vessel classes
World War II minesweepers of the United States